Anjialava Be or Anjialavabe is a commune in northern Madagascar. It belongs to the district of Andapa, which is a part of Sava Region. According to 2001 census the population of Anjialava Be was 5,528.

Only primary schooling is available in town. The population are farmers, and the most important crops are coffee and vanilla; also rice is an important agricultural product.

References and notes 

Populated places in Sava Region